Picong, officially the Municipality of Picong (Maranao: Inged a Picong), is a 4th class municipality in the province of Lanao del Sur, Philippines. According to the 2020 census, it has a population of 18,907 people.

History
Formerly known as Sultan Gumander, the municipality was renamed in 2006 pursuant to Muslim Mindanao Autonomy Act No. 175 dated December 16, 2004, which was ratified through a plebiscite conducted by the Commission of Elections on March 25, 2006.

Alinader Dagar Balindong is the incumbent mayor. He was elected thrice as mayor in 1998 up to 2004. He runs as vice mayor in 2007 as unopposed candidate. Mayor Tanaun as he fondly called by his constituents is the son of great old man of the Balindong clan then Mayor of Malabang Sultan Amir Macaorao Balindong. Siblings of Mayor Tanaun includes the former Congressman and House Deputy Speaker, Atty. Pangalian Balindong of 2nd district of Lanao del Sur and the incumbent Vice Mayor of Malabang, Lanao del Sur. This Balindong family is dominating the political landscape of the 2nd district of Lanao del Sur.

Geography

Barangays
Picong is politically subdivided into 19 barangays.

Anas
Bara-as
Biasong (Badak)
Bulangos
Durian
Ilian
Liangan (Poblacion)
Maganding
Maladi
Mapantao
Micalubo
Mimbalawag
Pindolonan
Punong
Ramitan
Torogan
Tual
Tuca
Ubanoban (Maladig)

Climate

Demographics

Economy

See also
List of renamed cities and municipalities in the Philippines

References

External links
 Picong Profile at the DTI Cities and Municipalities Competitive Index
 [ Philippine Standard Geographic Code]
 MMA Act No. 175 : An Act Changing the Name of the Municipality of Sultan Kumander to the Municipality of Picong
 Philippine Census Information
 Local Governance Performance Management System

Municipalities of Lanao del Sur